Claudio Úbeda (born September 17, 1969 in Rosario, Argentina) is a football manager and former player who played as a defender included a brief stint with Tampico Madero in the 1994-95 season. He is the current assistant manager of Saudi club Al-Nassr.

Úbeda was a participant at the 1989 FIFA World Youth Championship in Saudi Arabia.

In 2007 Úbeda was transferred to Club Atlético Huracán where he was selected to replace Osvaldo Ardiles as manager of the club, for the Clausura 2008.

Úbeda is currently the reserve team manager at Racing Club de Avellaneda, a club at which he holds iconic status.

Club statistics

Honours
Racing Club
Argentine Primera División (1): Apertura 2001

References

External links

 Ubeda's official website
 Argentine Primera statistics

1969 births
Living people
Argentine footballers
Argentine expatriate footballers
Argentina youth international footballers
Argentina under-20 international footballers
Rosario Central footballers
Racing Club de Avellaneda footballers
Club Atlético Huracán footballers
Argentine Primera División players
Liga MX players
Tokyo Verdy players
J1 League players
Expatriate footballers in Japan
Expatriate footballers in Mexico
Expatriate football managers in Chile
Argentine expatriate sportspeople in Chile
Argentine expatriate sportspeople in Mexico
Argentine football managers
Magallanes managers
Club Atlético Huracán managers
Racing Club de Avellaneda managers
Association football defenders
Footballers from Rosario, Santa Fe
Argentina national under-20 football team managers